Rachel Chebet Ruto (born 20 November 1968) is a Kenyan educator currently serving as the First Lady of Kenya. She is the wife to William Ruto, the fifth and current President of Kenya. 

The first lady has been prominent for her spirituality and recently while speaking at the African Union Summit mentioned that she is using "Faith Diplomacy" to empower women economically.

Early life 
Rachel Chebet was born in Likuyani, Kakamega County, Western Region on 20 November 1968.

Education and career 
She went to Likuyani Primary School, Kakamega County. She then proceeded to Butere Girls High School for her O and A levels. She passed her advanced level education, and subsequently was called to join the Kenyatta University where she pursued a Bachelor of Education  (Arts) degree. She went on to earn her Master of Arts in 2011 at the Catholic University of Eastern Africa.

Although she studied Education, she did not get a chance to practice teaching for long. She voluntarily retired and ventured into entrepreneurship in the tour and travel business, taking people throughout the country to places like Maasai Mara and Mombasa etc.

Activism and recognition 
During her tenure as the Second Lady of Kenya, she became an advocate for women's rights and women's empowerment. Through the Joyful Women Organization, she spurred a table banking initiative throughout Kenya, and spread to the rest of Africa.

On 17 January 2014, Rachel Ruto was awarded the International Honorary Fellowship Award On Women Empowerment at the Binary University in Malaysia.

She has been championing for healthy living through physical exercise such as cycling and launched Mama Cycling initiative in September to promote the practice.

In March 2023, she expressed opposition to same sex relationships, following a Kenyan Supreme Court ruling allowing LGBTQ groups to organise.

Family
Rachel and William were married in 1991 at the AIC church. They met while they were in university at a Christian Union rally at the University of Nairobi. Rachel was studying education at Kenyatta University while her husband was taking botany and zoology at the University of Nairobi. The couple has six children including Charlene Ruto. The couple adopted baby Nadia, who had been buried alive. They named the baby Cherono, after Ruto’s mother.

References

First ladies of Kenya
Spouses of national leaders
Living people
1968 births
People from Kakamega
Kenyan educators
Kenyatta University alumni
Catholic University of Eastern Africa alumni